Woodrow Wilson "Red" Sovine (July 7, 1917 – April 4, 1980) was an American country music singer and songwriter associated with truck driving songs, particularly those recited as narratives but set to music. His most noted examples are "Giddyup Go" (1965) and "Teddy Bear" (1976), both of which topped the Billboard Hot Country Songs chart.

Biography 
Sovine was born in 1917 in Charleston, West Virginia, earning the nickname "Red" because of his reddish-brown hair. He had two brothers and two sisters. Sovine was taught to play guitar by his mother. His first venture into music was with his childhood friend Johnnie Bailes, with whom he performed as "Smiley and Red, the Singing Sailors" in the country music revue Jim Pike's Carolina Tar Heels on WWVA-AM in Wheeling, West Virginia. Faced with limited success, Bailes left to perform as part of The Bailes Brothers. Sovine got married, and continued to sing on Charleston radio, while holding down a job as a supervisor of a hosiery factory. With the encouragement of Bailes, Sovine formed The Echo Valley Boys.

Career 
After a year of performing in West Virginia, Sovine moved to Shreveport, Louisiana, where the Bailes Brothers were performing on KWKH-AM. Sovine's own early morning show was not popular, but he gained greater exposure performing on the famed KWKH radio program, Louisiana Hayride. One of his co-stars was Hank Williams, who steered Sovine toward a better time slot at WSFA in Montgomery, Alabama, and toward a contract with MGM Records in 1949. That same year, Sovine replaced Williams on Louisiana Hayride when Williams jumped to the Grand Ole Opry.

Another Louisiana Hayride co-star who helped Sovine was country music legend Webb Pierce, who convinced Sovine to lead his Wondering Boys band and helped him toward a contract with Decca in 1954. The following year Sovine cut a duet with Goldie Hill, "Are You Mine?" which peaked in the Top 15, and in 1956 he had his first number one hit when he duetted with Pierce on a cover of George Jones' "Why Baby Why". Sovine had two other Top Five singles that year and became a member of the Grand Ole Opry. After recording close to 50 sides with Decca by 1959, Sovine signed to Starday Records and began touring the club circuit as a solo act. That same year, Sovine was seriously injured in a car accident that claimed the life of two of his band members, Douglas Nicks and Johnny Morris.

1960s 
In 1961, a song copyrighted in 1955 by Sovine and co-writer Dale Noe became a sizeable hit on the pop chart. The tune was the ballad "Missing You", arranged in Countrypolitan style and was recorded by Ray Peterson for his own Dunes label. "Missing You" became a No. 29 Billboard "Top 100" hit. In the fall, it peaked at No. 7 on Billboard's "Adult Contemporary" chart. In 1963, Sovine passed on the helping hand given him by older performers when he heard the singing of minor league baseball player Charley Pride and suggested that he move to Nashville, Tennessee. Sovine opened doors for Pride at Pierce's Cedarwood Publishing, but his own career had stalled: "Dream House For Sale", which reached number 22 in 1964, came nearly eight years after his last hit.

Truck-driving songs 
In 1965, Sovine found his niche when he recorded "Giddyup Go", which, like most of his other trucker hits, he co-wrote with Tommy Hill. It is spoken, rather than sung, as the words of an older long-distance truck driver who rediscovers his long-lost son driving another truck on the same highway. Minnie Pearl released an answer song titled "Giddy-Up Go Answer". Sovine's version of the song spent six weeks atop the country charts. Other truck-driving country hits followed, including;

 "Phantom 309", a tale of a hitchhiker who hops a ride from a trucker who turns out to be the ghost of a man who died years ago giving his life to save a school bus full of children from a horrible collision with his rig. This story was later adapted by singer-songwriter Tom Waits, who performed "Big Joe And Phantom 309" during his Nighthawks At The Diner recordings. Waits' version of this song was covered by Archers of Loaf on the 1995 tribute album, Step Right Up: The Songs of Tom Waits. Musician Steve Flett named a recording project after the song. The song was originally written and recorded by Tommy Faile.
 "Teddy Bear", the tale of a disabled boy who lost his truck driver father in a highway accident and keeps his CB radio base as his only companion.
 "Little Joe", a tale of a trucker and his devoted canine friend which became his last hit. This last story features the Teddy Bear character, who can now walk.

Personal life and death 
Sovine was married to Norma Searls, who died on June 4, 1976, at the age of 57.

On April 4, 1980, Sovine suffered a heart attack while driving in southern Nashville, causing him to run a red light and strike an oncoming vehicle. He and the other driver, 25-year-old Edgar Primm, were transported to St. Thomas Hospital. While Primm was treated and released for minor facial injuries, Sovine died shortly after arrival. According to a preliminary autopsy, Sovine sustained massive abdominal bleeding caused by a lacerated spleen and liver, and fractured ribs and sternum.

Covers 

Sovine performed covers of many truck driving songs made popular by fellow country stars, such as Del Reeves and Dave Dudley, as well as "Why Baby Why", a duet with Webb Pierce originally recorded by George Jones. Other covers include "A Dear John Letter" (Jean Shepard and Ferlin Husky), "Old Rivers" (Walter Brennan), "Bringing Mary Home" (The Country Gentlemen), and "Roses for Mama" (C.W. McCall), among many more. Among his many other recitations was a reading of John Berrio's essay "Please God, I'm Only Seventeen", a cautionary tale of safety to newly licensed teen-aged drivers.

His last charting hit in his lifetime, in 1978, was a cover of Eric Clapton's "Lay Down Sally". Save for the mid-song guitar bridge, Sovine's version—a No. 70 hit on the Billboard Hot Country Singles chart—closely resembled the Clapton original.

Many of Sovine's biggest truck driving hits were covered by artists such as, Del Reeves, Dave Dudley, Ferlin Husky, Boxcar Willie, Tex Williams and Australian country singer Nev Nicholls. Mike Judge covered "Teddy Bear" as Hank Hill for the King of the Hill soundtrack. Some of Sovine's songs were covered by Dutch artists and became big hits in the Netherlands (including "Teddy Bear", "Giddy Up Go" and "Deck of Cards" by Gerard de Vries, "Phantom 309" (Stille Willie) by the B B Band, "Little Joe" (Kleine Waker) by Henk Wijngaard). Tom Waits released "Big Joe and Phantom 309" on his 1975 Nighthawks at the Diner.

Discography

Studio albums

Compilation albums

Singles 

A"Teddy Bear" also peaked at No. 1 on the RPM Country Tracks chart and No. 49 on the RPM Top Singles chart in Canada. It also hit No. 4 on the UK charts in 1981, the only song of his to chart in that country.

References

Further reading 

1917 births
1980 deaths
Musicians from Charleston, West Virginia
American male singer-songwriters
American country singer-songwriters
Grand Ole Opry members
Decca Records artists
MGM Records artists
Starday Records artists
RCA Victor artists
Country musicians from West Virginia
Road incident deaths in Tennessee
20th-century American singers
20th-century American male singers
Singer-songwriters from West Virginia